The X3 (stylized as the X3) is an 800 cc V4 race bike built by Ilmor Engineering to compete in the 2007 MotoGP series.

The X3 is the brainchild of Ilmor co-founder Mario Illien and former grand prix rider Eskil Suter of Suter Racing Technology (SRT). Illien used his world championship winning F1 engine experience to design the machine's V4 powerplant, with Suter, who has previously designed Kawasaki's MotoGP chassis, in charge of the twin-spar aluminum frame.

2006 Season 
With rider Garry McCoy, the X3 made its debut as a wildcard entry at the 2006 Portuguese Grand Prix and then two weeks later at the 2006 Valencia Grand Prix where the emphasis was more on testing than competition. McCoy exceeded expectations, putting in consistent performances to bring the Ilmor team their first two championship points and the first ever points awarded for an 800 cc capacity bike, though McCoy arrived last in both occasions, four and seven laps down respectively.

2007 Season
McCoy worked as a test rider for on the X3 development team and was expected to ride for Ilmor in 2007, but Andrew Pitt and Jeremy McWilliams were chosen instead. On 15 March 2007 after one race, the team announced that they were taking a break from Moto GP as a result of funding issues. On 30 April they announced that they would run a "slimmed-down" set-up focused purely on engine development, releasing all unnecessary personnel but keeping under contract riders McWilliams and Pitt.

References

External links
 Ilmor Engineering official site
 Ilmor GP official site

Grand Prix motorcycles
Motorcycles introduced in 2006